Wichelsee is a lake in Obwalden, Switzerland. The reservoir is located in the municipalities of Alpnach and Sarnen. It formed after the Sarner Aa was dammed in 1955. The area around the lake was protected in 2005.

References

Lakes of Obwalden
Wichel
RWichel
Protected areas of Switzerland